Hey It's Saberdey! was a Saturday noontime musical variety show that aired on TV5. It aired from June 18, 2011 to February 4, 2012.

Hosts

Main host
Alex Gonzaga
Kean Cipriano
J. C. de Vera
Danita Paner
IC Mendoza

Performers
Arci Muñoz 
Dianne Medina
Rodjun Cruz
Jasmine Curtis-Smith
Rainier Castillo
Carla Humphries
Edgar Allan Guzman
Lucky Mercado
Jay Durias
Gerald Santos
Wendy Valdez
Princess Ryan
Yana Asistio
Annyka Asistio
Ritz Azul
Morissette Amon
Christian Samson
Bagets Casts
Meg Imperial
Aki Torio
Eula Caballero
Rico dela Paz
Shy Carlos
AJ Muhlach
Nadine Lustre
Josh Padilla

Studios
Westside Studio, Broadway Centrum (TV5 Broadway Centrum, June 18, 2011 to February 4, 2012)

See also
List of programs aired by The 5 Network

References
PEP.ph (accessed 19 April 2011)

External links
 

Philippine variety television shows
2011 Philippine television series debuts
2012 Philippine television series endings
TV5 (Philippine TV network) original programming
Filipino-language television shows